The following list refer to list of Roman Catholic missionaries in India.

Early missionaries
 Thomas the Apostle
 St. Francis Xavier
 Giacomo Fenicio
 Roberto de Nobili
 Jordanus Catalani
 John  Marignolli

Roman Catholic missionaries

These include:

 Jordanus.
 Giovanni de' Marignolli alias John De Marignolli
 Roberto de Nobili
 St. Francis Xavier (1506–52)
 Matheus de Castro (1594–1677)
 Thomas de Castro (d. 1684)
 Ephrem de Nevers (d. 1695)
 John de Brito (d. 1647–1693)
 Joseph Vaz (1651–1711)
 Costantino Giuseppe Beschi (1680–1747)
 Mother Teresa (1910–1997)
 Mary Glowrey (1887-1957)
 Jim Borst (1932-2018)

See also

 List of Protestant missionaries in India 
 Mission (Christian)
 Christianity in India

References

Further reading

 In the Shadow of the Mahatma: Bishop V. S. Azariah and the Travails of Christianity in British India by Susan Billington Harper.
 Mother Teresa: A Complete Authorized Biography  by Kathryn Spink.

List
Missionaries In India
Roman Catholic Missionaries
Roman Catholic missionaries
India Roman Catholic